Joe Green (born 6 December 1994 in Watford) is an English professional squash player. As of February 2018, he was ranked number 114 in the world.

References

1994 births
Living people
English male squash players